Rockey's Air Strip  is an airport located in unincorporated Cass County, Indiana, United States. The airport is located east of Galveston, Indiana.

The airport is privately owned and managed by R. E. Rocky.

References

External links 

Airports in Indiana
Transportation buildings and structures in Cass County, Indiana